is a Japanese middle-distance runner. He competed in the men's 3000 metres steeplechase at the 1972 Summer Olympics.

References

1947 births
Living people
Athletes (track and field) at the 1972 Summer Olympics
Japanese male middle-distance runners
Japanese male steeplechase runners
Olympic athletes of Japan
Place of birth missing (living people)
20th-century Japanese people